Zaleski is a village in Vinton County, Ohio, United States. The population was 278 at the 2010 census.

History
Six Native American mounds, built by the prehistoric Adena culture, were once located at Zaleski.  Three have been destroyed, but the others — known as the Markham, Ranger Station and Zaleski Methodist Church Mounds — are still in existence. Together these three compose the Zaleski Mound Group.

Zaleski was laid out in 1856 as a mining community. The village was named for Peter. F. Zaleski, a Polish-American official with the mining company that originally owned the town site. Zaleski once had an iron blast furnace.

Beginning in February 2014, Zaleski began construction on a public sewer plant project, making it only the third village in the county (after, McArthur and Hamden) to have a public waste facility.

Geography
Zaleski is located at  (39.281850, -82.394461).

Zaleski is located on Raccoon Creek, a tributary of the Ohio River.

Demographics

2010 census
At the 2010 census, there were 278 people, 123 households and 80 families living in the village. The racial makeup of the village was 98.2% White, 0.4% from other races, and 1.4% from two or more races.

There were 123 households, of which 26.0% had children under the age of 18 living with them, 45.5% were married couples living together, 10.6% had a female householder with no husband present, 8.9% had a male householder with no wife present, and 35.0% were non-families. 33.3% of all households were made up of individuals, and 13.8% had someone living alone who was 65 years of age or older. The average household size was 2.26 and the average family size was 2.81.

The median age was 43 years. 19.4% of residents were under the age of 18; 8.7% were between the ages of 18 and 24; 24.5% were from 25 to 44; 32% were from 45 to 64; and 15.5% were 65 years of age or older. The gender makeup of the village was 50.0% male and 50.0% female.

2000 census
At the 2000 census, there were 375 people, 148 households and 111 families living in the village. The population density was 786.3 per square mile (301.6/km). There were 169 housing units at an average density of 354.4 per square mile (135.9/km). The racial makeup of the village was 98.13% White, 0.53% African American, 1.07% Native American, and 0.27% from two or more races.

There were 148 households, of which 31.8% had children under the age of 18 living with them, 55.4% were married couples living together, 12.2% had a female householder with no husband present, and 25.0% were non-families. 22.3% of all households were made up of individuals, and 11.5% had someone living alone who was 65 years of age or older. The average household size was 2.53 and the average family size was 2.86.

22.7% of the population were under the age of 18, 8.3% from 18 to 24, 32.3% from 25 to 44, 24.8% from 45 to 64, and 12.0% who were 65 years of age or older. The median age was 37 years. For every 100 females, there were 95.3 males. For every 100 females age 18 and over, there were 88.3 males.

The median household income was $29,500 and the median family income was $33,750. Males had a median income of $27,500 compared with $22,083 for females. The per capita income for the village was $13,443. About 9.9% of families and 16.7% of the population were below the poverty line, including 10.8% of those under age 18 and 28.1% of those age 65 or over.

References

Villages in Vinton County, Ohio
Villages in Ohio
Protected areas established in 1856
1856 establishments in Ohio
Populated places established in 1856